is a Japanese female badminton player.

Achievements

BWF International Challenge/Series
Women Doubles

 BWF International Challenge tournament
 BWF International Series tournament
 BWF Future Series tournament

References

External links 
 

1991 births
Living people
Sportspeople from Shiga Prefecture
Japanese female badminton players
21st-century Japanese women